"The Price of Love" is a song by the Everly Brothers, released in 1965. It charted at No. 2 in the UK Singles Chart and No. 3 on the Irish Singles Chart. It spent one week at Number 1 on the UK's NME chart, but in the US, the song failed to chart on the Billboard Hot 100.

Cash Box described it as "a raunchy, pulsating bluesy thumper which delineates the problems of a modern-day teenager romance."

Bryan Ferry version 

Bryan Ferry included a recording of the song on his album 1976 Let's Stick Together, and as the first track on the July 1976 EP Extended Play. It reached No. 7 in the UK chart, peaked at No. 9 on the Australian Singles Chart and was the 69th biggest selling single in Australia in 1976.

Other cover versions 
The song was recorded and released by the British Rock band Status Quo in 1969. It was released on the same day as the album Spare Parts, but was not included on it, and it failed to chart. Bob Young is featured on harmonica, The band re-recorded it in 1991 for inclusion on the album, Rock 'til You Drop.

Track listing 
 "The Price of Love" (D. Everly/P. Everly) (3.40)
 "Little Miss Nothing" (Rossi/Parfitt) (2.58)

Poco recorded the song in 1982, on their album Cowboys & Englishmen.

British duo Robson & Jerome included a version on their 1997 album Take Two, which reached No. 1 in the UK.

In 2021 Robert Plant and Alison Krauss also covered the song, as a duet, on their second album  Raise the Roof.

Chart performance

References 

The Everly Brothers songs
Status Quo (band) songs
Bryan Ferry songs
1965 singles
1969 singles
1976 singles
Songs written by Phil Everly
Songs written by Don Everly
Song recordings produced by John Schroeder (musician)
1965 songs